is a Japanese former speed skater who competed in the 1952 Winter Olympics and in the 1956 Winter Olympics. He was born in Nagano Prefecture. In 1952 he finished sixth in the 500 metres competition and 34th in the 1500 metres event. Four years later he finished 30th in the 500 metres contest at the 1956 Games.

References
Kiyotaka Takabayashi's profile at Sports Reference.com

External links

1928 births
Possibly living people
Japanese male speed skaters
Speed skaters at the 1952 Winter Olympics
Speed skaters at the 1956 Winter Olympics
Olympic speed skaters of Japan
Sportspeople from Nagano Prefecture
20th-century Japanese people